Story of Nhô village is a 1997 Vietnamese telefilm adapted from Nguyễn Quang Thiều's 1994 novel The assassin of the fields (Kẻ ám sát cánh đồng). The film was produced by Vietnam Television Film Center and directed by Đặng Lưu Việt Bảo.

Plot
During the Renovation, Trịnh Khả who was a professor of Vietnam Maritime University came back his countryside. He started calling Nhô village's oldmen and commune officials for the regaining 75 acres fields which Nhô people has allowed Tam San village to borrowing 30 years ago. He was deputed as the commander by village people. Then he established the 447 department to against the corruption and protect his village.

Some 447 members killed impassible two fishing merchants, so the police started taking part.

Production
Production was executed in the Vĩnh Ngọc commune, Đông Anh district, Hanoi during the summer of 1997.

Art
 Assistant : Xuân Hương
 VTR : Xuân Kiện
 Light : Minh Châu, Minh Dương
 Montage : Hoàng Tú

Cast

 Nguyễn Hải ... Trịnh Khả
 Trần Tiến ... Mr Bong
 Huy Công ... Mr Tín
 Ngọc Thư ... Xinh - Khả's lover
 Hoàng Lan ... Teacher Vân
 Công Bảy ... Chức
 Chí Thông ... Hòa
 Minh Quang ... Triết - District policeman
 Hồng Tuấn ... Đoán
 Bá Cường ... Commune secretary Nhút
 Hồng Điệp ... Vân's mother
 Hồng Giang ... Tứ Sứt
 Đình Thắng ... Commune policeman
 Minh Tuấn ... Hoan
 Kim Quý ... Khả's spouse
 Thanh Tùng ... Tâm
 Đức Long ... Clerk Tất
 Thu Ngà ... Chức's spouse
 Vân Anh ... Hòa's spouse
 Ngọc Anh ... Tâm's spouse
 Thúy Hiền ... Đoán's spouse

And : Nam Cường, Thế Hồng, Hồ Trung, Đức Mẫn, Ngọc Phúc, Văn Kiện, Trần Tùng, Mạnh Kiểm, Thế Bình, Tuấn Dương, Quốc Phong, Mạnh Thắng, Oldman Nhân, Dương Tùng, Văn Ngọc, Hoàng Tuấn, Baby Tí...

Broadcast

References

 Trịnh Khả và nỗi ám ảnh Truyện làng Nhô

Vietnamese drama television series
Films based on works by Vietnamese writers
1997 films